Ship of Fools is an original novel by Dave Stone  featuring the fictional archaeologist Bernice Summerfield. The New Adventures were a spin-off from the long-running British science fiction television series Doctor Who.

External links
The Cloister Library - Ship of Fools

1997 British novels
1997 science fiction novels
Virgin New Adventures
Bernice Summerfield novels
British science fiction novels
Novels by Dave Stone